The Georgia Collegiate Athletic Association (also known as GCAA) is a college athletic conference and member of the National Junior College Athletic Association (NJCAA) in the NJCAA Region 17. Members of the GCAA include technical and community colleges in the U.S. state of Georgia. Conference championships are held in most sports and individuals can be named to All-Conference and All-Academic teams. The conference is the successor to the Georgia Junior College Athletic Association (GJCAA), which began in 1967. In 2010, All of the existing members of the GJCAA joined the newly organized Georgia Collegiate Athletic Association.

Member schools

Current members
The GCAA currently has 12 full members, all but two are public schools:

Notes

Former members
The GCAA had 12 former full members, all but one were public schools:

Notes

Membership timeline

See also
National Junior College Athletic Association (NJCAA)

External links
 Official website
NJCAA Website

NJCAA conferences
College sports in Georgia (U.S. state)